Rao Sahib Ayyathan Gopalan (3 March 1861 – 2 May 1948), popularly known as Darsarji and Darsar Sahib ("Darsar" means "doctor", derived from Latin word "docere" for doctor), was an Indian doctor, surgeon, professor, writer, philanthropist, social reformer, and Renaissance leader from Kerala. He is the founder of the Sugunavardhini movement (1900) and Depressed classes mission (1909) and also the leader and propagandist of Brahmo Samaj (1893) in Kerala. He denounced idol worship and fought to end those social practices in Kerala that he thought were unethical. Among his followers were Brahmananda Swami Sivayogi,  Vaghbatananda, and Brahmavadhi P. Kunhiraman. Gopalan titled P. Kunhiraman as "Brahmavadhi" and Sivayogi as "Brahmananda Swami".

He was awarded and honored by the British government with the highest civilian award and title, the "Rao Sahib", for his services. The formation of the Sugunavardhini movement, Depressed classes mission and Brahmosamaj played a significant role in the Kerala reformation movement.

Life
Gopalan was born at Anjarakkandi Thalassery, Kerala,in Ayathan family (Aristocratic royal family of Malabar) as the first son of Ayyathan Chandhan and Kallatt Chirutha Ammal. His youngest sister, Ayyathan Janaki Ammal was the first female doctor in Kerala as well as in Malabar(which was an administrative district of Madras Presidency during British rule in India).She was also the first female doctor from the Thiyya community and also hailed the title as the First Malayali lady doctor and surgeon.

He opposed superstitions and caste believes at an early age. Gopalan was the Renaissance leader who had his hair cut as part of a protest during his high school years, contrary to the traditional way in which members of the ruling aristocratic community were forced to grow their hair and make a tuft of hair and keep it in a traditional way. 

Reluctant to observe caste differences or customs. He was against all caste evils and lived as a true "Brahmo" until his death. He did not act or oppose any other reform movements or any caste movements, but instead worked as a free man to revive society from all social evils.

He never preserved the name of the caste in which he was born, nor spoke for their upliftment. Instead he criticized the superstitions and superstitious practices inside his own caste. Although he was from the Thiyya community, he never followed their customs and did not live as a Thiyya, thus being excommunicated from the thiyyar caste at an early age.

He studied at Anjarakkandy elementary school, Brennen School, Mission High School and later joined Madras Medical College on 19 September 1884. He read about the Raja Ram Mohan Roy's Brahmo Samaj., Joined Brahmo Samaj and engaged in its social reform activities and became an active executive member of the General Committee of Calcutta Brahmo Samaj. He participated in the committee's annual conferences at various locations across India, along with Brahmo leaders such as Kesub Chandra Sen, Debendranath Tagore, Sivanath Sastri, Rabindranath Tagore, and R. G. Bhandarkar. In 1888, he obtained a medical degree with honors and entered into government service.Dr.Ayathan Gopalan was the first male doctor from the Thiyya community and also in the family.He worked as a medic in several hospitals across South India and as a medical lecturer.

Gopalan married Kallat Kausallyaammal  on 30 December 1894. Ramakrishna Gobal Bhandhakar, a Brahmo leader and social reformer at that time, conducted the wedding at the Madras Brahmo Samaj. Several Brahmo leaders presided over the wedding. This was the first Brahmo wedding to be conducted at Madras Brahmosamaj, and also the first Brahmo wedding of South India. Kausallyaammal was a strong supporter of Gopalan and assisted his social reform activities.

Social reform activities

Establishment of Brahmosamaj branches in Kerala 
Gopalan worked as a doctor, chief surgeon, and superintendent at several hospitals in South India. He returned to Kerala in 1897 and joined the Calicut Lunatic asylum (now the Kuthiravattom Mental Hospital) as its first Indian superintendent. Meanwhile, caste and racial discrimination, malicious practices, and social injustices were prevalent in Kerala, and atrocities against women and children were at their peak. He instituted Brahmosamaj in Kerala for the first time in 1893.

Gopalan extended his reform ideologies and propagated his reform activities by establishing the first branch of Brahmo Samaj on 17 January 1898 at Calicut. To conduct Samaj's meetings and prayers, a separate  (lit. "hall")now Ayathan Gopalan Memorial Schoolwas opened to the public on 1 October 1900. The  was inaugurated by Mana Vikraman Ettan Thampuran, the Zamorin King of Calicut.

Branches of Brahmo Samaj was set up at Alathur, Thalassery and also at Alappuzha in the year 1924.Later, Intercaste marriages were inspired in South Kerala. Under the leadership of Gopalan, social reforms were able to make great strides.

Sugunavardhini Movement and Depressed Classes Mission 
In the year 1900, Gopalan and Kausallyaammal initiated the Sugunavardhini Movement and extended his social reform activities. Through this movement, he worked to foster human values in children, attract children to his social activities, protect the rights of women, and provide free education to girls and marginalised sections of society. In 1909 he established the Depressed Classes Mission for the upliftment of Harijan (Dalit) communities in Kerala, under which he established schools and provided free education for downtrodden sections of the society. He established the Chandhawarkar Elementary School with the intention to educate girls and the underprivileged sections of society.

Gopalan also participated in the Thali Road strike (Samaram at Calicut).

Impact of Sugunavardhini, Depressed Classes Mission and Brahmosamaj at Malabar 
The hymns for prayers sung at Brahmo Samaj were composed by Gopalan and are compiled in his book Keerthanaratnamala. He conducted several inter-caste marriages at Brahmo Samaj and worked to promote non-idol worship. "Brahmodharma", better known as the Brahmosamaj Bible, was written in Bengali by Maharshi Debendranath Tagore and was translated by him into Malayalam. He promoted his reformist ideologies by conducting dramas, public awareness campaign, and writings.

The Sugunavardhini Movement and Brahmo Samaj were composed mostly of professionals and intellectuals, including Brahmananda Swamisivayogi, Vagbhatananda Guru, and Brahmavadi P. Kunhiraman, all with a more secular approach to reform.

He raised his children, grandchildren, and all his followers as a good man, without raising them to live under a particular race, religion, or creed. It is for this reason that their name has been retained as "Brahmo" without a caste name.

All of his children are intermarried (Intercaste marriage). All of them were married according to Brahmasamaj rituals. Even today, his children, grandchildren, family and followers remain casteless without caste names.

Rabindranath Tagore described Ayyathan Gopalan as the "Raja Ram Mohan Roy of Kerala" during the annual general meeting of the Brahmo Samaj.

On 4 June 1917, Gopalan was honored by the British Government with the highest civilian award and title, Rao Sahib, for his social and humanitarian services.

He died on 2 May 1948.

Works
Gopalan translated the Bible of Brahmo Samaj, Brahmodharma, which was initially written in Bengali by Maharshi Debendranath Tagore, to Malayalam in 1904. He also wrote songs and keerthanams to be sung during Brahmo Samaj prayer meetings. He propagated his reform ideologies through drama, public awareness, and his writings. Saranjiniparinayam(1901)(musical drama), Susheeladukham(1903) (musical drama), and Plaguefarse(drama) were among his famous dramas performed throughout by PSV Natya sangam in Kerala for many years. His other literary contributions are listed below:

 Raagamaalika(1894) first book
 Brahmadharmam
 Saranjiniparinayam (musical drama)
 Susheeladukham (musical drama)
 Plague Farse (drama)
 Gaanamaalika
 Grihadharma Geethamrutham
 Keerthanaratnamala
 Brahmamatham
 Rammohunroy (Harikatha)
 Madhaaikyam
 Madhavum Guruvum
 Madhavan
 Aaradhanayude Randu Padikal
 Brahma Madhavum Ithara Madhangalum
 Jaathi
 Vivaahageethangal
 Jai Britannia
 Yeshu Daivamayirunnuvo!
 British Bharana Mahathmyam
 Ente Amma (memoir of mother Kallat Chiruthammal)

Books about Ayyathan Gopalan
 First authoritative biography book of Ayathan Gopalan "Appan, oru ormapusthakam" in Malayalam written by Ayathan Alok.
 First authenticative biography book of Rao Sahib Dr. Ayathan Gopalan, "Darsar, The untold story of an unsung hero" in English (author Ayathan Alok).

See also 
 Ayyathan Janaki Ammal
 Vagbhatananda
 Brahmananda Swami Sivayogi
 Mithavaadi Krishnan
 Moorkoth Kumaran
 Kallingal Madathil Rarichan Moopan

References

Bibliography
 Appan oru ormapusthakam First authoritative biography book and memoir of Ayathan Gopalan written by Ayathan Alok (2021).
 Darsar,"The Untold story of an Unsung hero", first biography of Rao Sahib Dr. Ayathan Gopalan written in English by Ayathan Alok.
 Dr. Ayyathan Gopalan  Malayalam Memoir (2013) edited by V.R.Govindhanunni published by Mathrubhumi books, Kozhikode
 Maharshi Vaghbhatananda Gurudevar, by Swami Brahmavrithan
 A Survey of Kerala History Prof. Sreedharan Menon .A. (1967). Kottayam: Sahitya Pravarthaka Co-operative Society [Sales Dept.]; National Book Stall.
 Prof.Sreedharamenon .A. (1987) Kerala History and its Makers, Kottayam; National bookstall
 Kurup, K. K. N. (1988), Modern Kerala: Studies in Social and Agrarian Relations, Mittal Publications, 
 Kurup (1988), p. 94
 Kurup, K. K. N. (September 1988). "Peasantry and the Anti-Imperialist Struggles in Kerala". Social Scientist. 16 (9): 35–45. . .
 Biography of Brahmanada Sivayogi written by K Bheeman Nair Asathyathil ninnu sathyathilekku(അസത്യത്തിൽ നിന്ന് സത്യത്തിലേക്ക്)
 Biography of Brahmananda Swami Sivayogy by A K Nair
 Brahmananda Swami Sivayogi by Pavana
Journal of Indian history, University of Kerela Press, 2001 p270

1861 births
1948 deaths
20th-century Indian medical doctors
Indian writers
Medical doctors from Kerala
People from Thalassery
Social reformers
Indian male writers
Malayali people
Magistrates
Indian phycologists
Madras Medical College alumni
19th-century Indian writers
20th-century Indian writers
Writers from Kerala
20th-century Indian philosophers
19th-century Indian philosophers
Activists from Kerala
Indian social reformers
Dalit activists
Malayalam-language writers
Indian atheists
Scholars from Kerala
Indian Sanskrit scholars
19th-century Indian male writers
20th-century Indian male writers
Brahmos
Indian reformers
20th-century Hindu philosophers and theologians
Hindu revivalists
Brahmoism
Neo-Vedanta
Anti-caste activists